Pigeon Lake may refer to:

 Pigeon Lake (Alberta)
 Pigeon Lake (Ontario)
 Pigeon Lake Wilderness Area, New York